In enzymology, a phosphopentomutase is an enzyme that catalyzes the chemical reaction

alpha-D-ribose 1-phosphate  D-ribose 5-phosphate

Hence, this enzyme has one substrate, alpha-D-ribose 1-phosphate, and one product, D-ribose 5-phosphate.

This enzyme belongs to the family of isomerases, specifically the phosphotransferases (phosphomutases), which transfer phosphate groups within a molecule.  The systematic name of this enzyme class is alpha-D-ribose 1,5-phosphomutase. Other names in common use include phosphodeoxyribomutase, deoxyribose phosphomutase, deoxyribomutase, phosphoribomutase, alpha-D-glucose-1,6-bisphosphate:deoxy-D-ribose-1-phosphate, phosphotransferase, and D-ribose 1,5-phosphomutase. This enzyme participates in pentose phosphate pathway and purine metabolism.  It has 3 cofactors: D-ribose 1,5-bisphosphate, alpha-D-Glucose 1,6-bisphosphate,  and 2-Deoxy-D-ribose 1,5-bisphosphate.

Structural studies

The first published description of a structure of a prokaryotic phosphopentomutase was in 2011.

References

 
 
 Boyer, P.D. (Ed.), The Enzymes, 3rd ed., vol. 6, 1972, p. 407-477.

EC 5.4.2
Enzymes of known structure